Andrew Jackson Harlan (March 29, 1815 – May 19, 1907) was a U.S. Representative from Indiana and later a member of the Missouri House of Representatives. He was a cousin of Aaron Harlan.

Born near Wilmington, Ohio, Harlan attended the public schools. He studied law, was admitted to the bar in 1839 and commenced practice in Richmond, Indiana. He moved to Marion, Indiana, in 1839.

Career
He served as a clerk of the Indiana House of Representatives in 1842 and a member 1846-1848.

U.S. House of Representatives 
Harlan was elected as a Democrat to the Thirty-first Congress (March 4, 1849 – March 3, 1851).

Harlan was elected to the Thirty-third Congress (March 4, 1853 – March 3, 1855). He served as chairman of the Committee on Mileage (Thirty-third Congress). In a Democratic congressional convention at Marion, Indiana in 1854, he was publicly read out of the Democratic Party for voting against the repeal of the Missouri Compromise. He declined the nomination from the People's Party in 1854 for the Thirty-fourth Congress, and afterward allied himself with the Republican Party.

Post-congressional career 
He moved to Dakota Territory in 1861, where he served as a member of the Territorial house of representatives in 1861 and served as speaker. He was driven from the Territory by the Indians in September 1862 and settled in Savannah, Missouri, where he resumed the practice of law. He served as a member of the Missouri House of Representatives 1864-1868, serving as a speaker for the last two years.

Later life 
He moved to Wakeeney, Kansas, in 1885 and practiced law. He was appointed by President Harrison as postmaster of Wakeeney and served from 1890 to 1894. He was removed to Savannah, Missouri, in 1894 and died there on May 19, 1907. He was interred in Savannah Cemetery.

References

1815 births
1907 deaths
Speakers of the Missouri House of Representatives
Members of the Dakota Territorial Legislature
Democratic Party members of the Indiana House of Representatives
Indiana lawyers
Kansas postmasters
People from Marion, Indiana
People from Savannah, Missouri
Democratic Party members of the United States House of Representatives from Indiana
19th-century American politicians
People from WaKeeney, Kansas